Fedor Fedorov may refer to:

Fiodar Fiodaraŭ (1911–1994), Belarusian physicist
Fedor Fedorov (ice hockey) (born 1981), hockey player